Goheonsan  is a mountain in the vicinity of the city of Ulsan, South Korea. It is part of the Yeongnam Alps mountain range.

See also
 List of mountains in Korea

Notes

References

External links
 Official website for the Yeongnam Alps

Mountains of South Korea
Mountains of Ulsan
One-thousanders of South Korea